Bahiano (born 1962) is an Argentine reggae singer. He has worked with Los Pericos, and started a solo career in 2004.

Discography

With Los Pericos
 El ritual de la banana (1987)
 King Kong (1988)
 Maxi anfitreu (1989)
 Rab a Dab Stail (1990)
 Big Yuyo (1992)
 Maxi 1992 (1992)
 Los Maxis (1994)
 Pampas Reggae (1994)
 Yerba buena (1996)
 Mystic Love (1998)
 1000 vivos (2000)
 Desde cero (2002)

Solo career
 BH+ (2005)
 Nomade (2008)
 Rey mago de las nubes (2011)

References

21st-century Argentine male singers
Singers from Buenos Aires
1962 births
Living people
20th-century Argentine male singers